also known by  and his Chinese style name , was a bureaucrat of Ryukyu Kingdom. He was born to an aristocrat family called Ba-uji Yonabaru Dunchi.

King Shō On dispatched a gratitude envoy for his accession to Edo, Japan in 1796. They sailed back in the next year.

He served as a member of Sanshikan from 1798 to 1803.

References

1737 births
1803 deaths
Ueekata
Sanshikan
People of the Ryukyu Kingdom
Ryukyuan people
18th-century Ryukyuan people